The 2017 World Touring Car Championship was the fourteenth and last season of the FIA World Touring Car Championship, and the thirteenth since the series was revived in 2005. For this season, there were a few rules changes.

Teams and drivers

Team changes
 Citroën withdrew their factory team from the series in 2016 to concentrate on their 2017 World Rally Championship campaign with the C3 WRC. The C-Elysée WTCC was still available to private entries. 
 Lada also withdrew their factory team at the end of the 2016 season. RC Motorsport then entered the Championship running a pair of Vesta WTCC cars before adding third car at selected rounds.
 Volvo will expand its campaign to three full-time entries from two full-time entries. All the three cars will be entered by Polestar Cyan Racing.
 Münnich Motorsport switched to a Citroën C-Elysée WTCC for the 2017 season after racing with a Chevrolet RML Cruze TC1 for the last three seasons.

Driver changes
 Four time champion Yvan Muller retired after 2016. But has been brought out of retirement by Polestar Cyan Racing in order to assist Volvo’s challenge for the season finale in Qatar.
 Three time champion José María López left WTCC to join Toyota's WEC team in conjunction with a Formula E programme.
 Following the withdrawal of Lada, Gabriele Tarquini was unable to find a seat and left the series to join Hyundai's development of the i30 TCR. However he made a return at the Race of China for Honda after Tiago Monteiro was forced to withdraw after suffering from the after-effects of a crash in testing in early September.
 Following the withdrawal of Lada, Hugo Valente left WTCC for TCR.
 Fredrik Ekblom left Polestar Cyan Racing and returned to the STCC with Kristoffersson Motorsport.
 Following the withdrawal of Lada, Nick Catsburg joined Polestar Cyan Racing.
 After competing in two rounds in 2015 and one round in 2016, Néstor Girolami will make his full-time World Touring Car Championship debut in 2017, racing for Polestar Cyan Racing.
 Ryo Michigami joined Honda Racing Team JAS for a full-season campaign after making his World Touring Car Championship debut at his home race in Japan during the 2016 season.
 Robert Huff left the Castrol Honda World Touring Car Team to join Münnich Motorsport.
 John Filippi left Campos Racing to join Sébastien Loeb Racing.
 Aurélien Panis entered the series, driving for Zengő Motorsport.
 Yann Ehrlacher entered the series, driving for RC Motorsport.
 Kevin Gleason entered the series, driving for RC Motorsport.

Rule changes
More points will be awarded for the winners of the Manufacturers Against the Clock (MAC3) team time trials (12 rather than 10), optional rallycross-style "joker laps" will be introduced in street-circuits, the second or "main race" on a race weekend will be increased in length to two laps longer than the opening races (with the exception of the Race of Germany at Nürburgring Nordschleife), the points scoring structure will be revised with more points awarded in the main race, and the length of race meetings will be reduced to two days, with testing on Fridays to be abolished and the Free Practice 1 and 2 sessions being increased from 30 to 45 minutes to compensate.

Calendar

The Monza and Macau circuits return to the WTCC, whereas France, Russia and Slovakia are dropped.

Results and standings

Compensation weights 
base weight of 1,100 kg

Races

Championship standings

Drivers' championship
China Race 2 was half-points awarded.

† – Drivers did not finish the race, but were classified as they completed over 75% of the race distance.
‡ – Honda Racing Team JAS was disqualified from the Race of China because of non-compliant fuel injectors.

Championship points were awarded on the results of each race at each event as follows:

Notes
1 2 3 4 5 refers to the classification of the drivers after the qualifying for the main race (second race), where bonus points are awarded 5–4–3–2–1.

Manufacturers' Championship

Notes
Only the two best placed cars of each manufacturer earned points.
1 2 3 4 5 refers to the classification of the drivers in the main race qualification, where bonus points are awarded 5–4–3–2–1. Points were only awarded to the fastest two cars from each manufacturer.

In MAC3 points are awarded if 3 cars of the same manufacturer within a 15 seconds gap.
MAC3 points were awarded as follows:

WTCC Trophy
WTCC Trophy points are awarded to the first eight drivers classified in each race on the following scale: 10-8-6-5-4-3-2-1. One point is awarded to the highest-placed WTCC Trophy competitor in qualifying and another for the fastest lap in each race.

† – Drivers did not finish the race, but were classified as they completed over 75% of the race distance.

WTCC Teams' Trophy
All the teams taking part in the championship were eligible to score points towards the Teams' Trophy, with the exception of manufacturer teams, with the first car from each team scoring points in each race on the following scale: 10-8-6-5-4-3-2-1.

See also
 2017 European Touring Car Cup

References

External links
 Official website of the World Touring Cars Championship

 2017 World Touring Car Championship